Kutlwano Magazine (also known as Kutlwano) is a Botswana magazine founded in 1962 by the Government of Botswana containing market news, government policies, entertainment and feature articles. It is published alongside Daily News Botswana.

See also 

 Botswana Television
 Radio Botswana
 Media in Botswana

References

External links 

 Official website

Mass media in Botswana